Vperyod is a rural locality (a selo) and the administrative centre of Vperedovsky Selsoviet, Kizlyarsky District, Republic of Dagestan, Russia. The population was 1,554 as of 2010. There are 17 streets.

Geography 
Vperyod is located 8 km north of Kizlyar (the district's administrative centre) by road. Zarya Kommuny and Kosyakino are the nearest rural localities.

Nationalities 
Avars and Russians live there.

References 

Rural localities in Kizlyarsky District